The 2018 Sydney Women's Sevens was the second tournament of the 2017–18 World Rugby Women's Sevens Series. It was the second edition of the Australian Women's Sevens and was held over the weekend of 26–28 January 2018 at Allianz Stadium in Sydney, Australia.

Performances at this tournament helped determine the first ten seedings for the 2018 Rugby World Cup Sevens together with the previous year's series and the 2017 Dubai Women's Sevens.

Format
The teams are drawn into three pools of four teams each. Each team plays every other team in their pool once. The top two teams from each pool advance to the Cup brackets while the top 2 third place teams also compete in the Cup/Plate. The other teams from each group play-off for the Challenge Trophy.

Teams
Eleven core teams are participating in the tournament along with one invited team, the highest-placing non-core team of the 2017 Oceania Women's Sevens Championship, Papua New Guinea:

Pool stage
All times in Australian Eastern Daylight Time (UTC+11:00)

Pool A

Pool B

Pool C

Knockout stage

Challenge Trophy

5th place

Cup

Tournament placings

Source: World Rugby

Players

Scoring leaders

Source: World Rugby

Dream Team
The following seven players were selected to the tournament Dream Team at the conclusion of the tournament:

See also
 World Rugby Women's Sevens Series
 2017–18 World Rugby Women's Sevens Series
 2018 Sydney Sevens (for men)

References

External links
Tournament Page

2018
2017–18 World Rugby Women's Sevens Series
2018 in Australian women's sport
2018 in women's rugby union
2018 in Australian rugby union
January 2018 sports events in Australia